The 1987 Special Honours in New Zealand was a Special Honours Lists, dated 6 February 1987, making the five foundation appointments to the Order of New Zealand.

Order of New Zealand (ONZ)
Ordinary member
 Te Arikinui Dame Te Atairangikaahu .
 Dr Clarence Edward Beeby .
 Sonja Margaret Loveday Davies .
 Sir Edmund Percival Hillary .
 The Honourable Sir Arnold Henry Nordmeyer  .

References

Special honours
Special honours